August von Parseval (5 February 1861, in Frankenthal (Pfalz) – 22 February 1942, in Berlin) was a German airship designer.

As a boy, Parseval attended the Royal Bavarian Pagenkorps in Munich from 1873 to 1878, where he took the Fähnrichexamen (cadet exams). He then joined the Royal Bavarian 3rd Infantry Regiment Prinz Carl von Bayern. An autodidact, he busied himself with the problems of aeronautics. In the garrison town of Augsburg he came into contact with August Riedinger and also came to know his later partner Rudolf Hans Bartsch von Sigsfeld, with whom he developed Drachenballons: balloons used by the military for observation.

In 1901 Parseval and Sigsfeld began building a dirigible airship. After Sigsfeld's death during a free balloon landing in 1902, the work was interrupted until 1905.

By 1905, thanks to improvements in motor design, an appropriate engine was now available. His designs were licensed to the British Vickers company.
Up to the end of the First World War, 22 Parseval airships (both non-rigid (blimps) and semi-rigid (with keels)) were built. In the late twenties and early thirties, four more semi-rigid airships were built in accordance with the "Parseval-Naatz principle".

Parseval is sometimes written Parzeval or Parceval, particularly in historical documents.

The flights of each 'Parseval', like those of the Zeppelins, excited great interest. In Kiel, a tavern closed in 2002 which had been named Zum Parseval upon the first visit of one of these airships in 1912.

See also
Parseval airships

Notes

External links

 
Tabellarischer Lebenslauf (German)
 

1861 births
1942 deaths
People from Frankenthal
People from the Palatinate (region)
German airship aviators
Airships of Germany
Academic staff of the Technical University of Berlin